The 1899 Primera División was the 8th season of top-flight football in Argentina. The season began on May 14 and ended on September 9. 

The league was reduced to only 4 teams due to Palermo A.C., United Banks and Banfield left the Association. Banfield registered to recently created Segunda División. Belgrano A.C. won its first Primera División title.

Lanús A.C. only completed 2 games, with the other 4 fixtures being awarded to their opponents. The game between Lomas and Lobos was awarded to Lobos.

Final table

References

Argentine Primera División seasons
1899 in Argentine football
1899 in South American football